James F. Eckhart (June 7, 1923 – October 17, 2007) was an American politician. He served as a Democratic member for the 115th district of the Florida House of Representatives.

Life and career 
Eckhart was born in Camden, New Jersey. He served in the United States Army Air Force during World War II.

In 1974, Eckhart was elected to represent the 115th district of the Florida House of Representatives, succeeding Murray Dubbin. He served until 1980, when he was succeeded by Jim Brodie.

Eckhart died in October 2007, at the age of 84.

References 

1923 births
2007 deaths
Politicians from Camden, New Jersey
Democratic Party members of the Florida House of Representatives
20th-century American politicians